John Rutherfoord (December 6, 1792August 3, 1866) was a U.S. political figure.  He served as Acting Governor of Virginia between 1841 and 1842. He was the brother-in-law of Edward Coles.

Biography
Rutherfoord graduated from Princeton University in 1816, studied law, and was admitted to the bar. He served in a militia unit called the Richmond Fayette Artillery, advancing through the ranks from captain to regimental commander with the rank of colonel.

He became president of the Mutual Assurance Society, Virginia's first insurance company. Originally a Democratic-Republican, and later a Whig, and then a Democrat, he served in the Virginia House of Delegates from December 1826 to March 1834. Rutherfoord was a member of the state Executive Council from 1839 to 1841.

In 1841 Governor Thomas Walker Gilmer resigned to accept election to a seat in the United States House of Representatives. His place was taken by John M. Patton, who was first in the line of succession as the Executive Council's senior member. Patton served just 12 days before he resigned. Having been designated as the senior member of the Executive Council, Rutherfoord then succeeded to the governorship.

Rutherfoord served one year, from March 31, 1841, to March 31, 1842. Upon his resignation, he was succeeded by another Executive Council member, John Munford Gregory, who completed the term to which Gilmer had been elected.

After resigning from the governorship, Rutherfoord returned to his business interests. He died in Richmond on August 3, 1866, and was buried in Richmond's  Shockoe Hill Cemetery.

References
A Guide to the Executive Papers of Governor John Rutherfoord, 1841-1842 at The Library of Virginia
John Rutherford at National Governors Association
The Peculiar Democracy: Southern Democrats in Peace and Civil War.  Wallace Hettle.  2001.
History of Virginia from Settlement of Jamestown to Close of the Civil War.  Robert Alonzo Brock, Virgil Anson Lewis.  1888.

1792 births
1866 deaths
Princeton University alumni
Virginia lawyers
American militia officers
Members of the Virginia House of Delegates
Governors of Virginia
Virginia Democratic-Republicans
Virginia Whigs
Virginia Democrats
Politicians from Richmond, Virginia
Democratic Party governors of Virginia
Burials in Virginia
19th-century American politicians
19th-century American lawyers
19th-century American businesspeople
Businesspeople from Richmond, Virginia
American businesspeople in insurance